Eurema nilgiriensis, the Nilgiri grass yellow, is a small butterfly of the family Pieridae, that is, the yellows and whites, which is found in south India.

It is closely related to Eurema andersoni, Eurema ormistoni, Eurema celebensis and Eurema beatrix. This species is known only from south India.

See also
List of butterflies of India
List of butterflies of India (Pieridae)

References

External links

nilgiriensis
Butterflies of Asia
Butterflies described in 1990